Arcadia is a neighborhood in the areas of Phoenix and Scottsdale, Arizona. It is bounded 44th Street to 68th Street and Camelback Road to the canal. Arcadia contains well-kept homes on large lots; these homes command relatively high property values (as the neighborhood is adjacent to the upscale suburbs of Paradise Valley, the Biltmore area, Scottsdale and north Phoenix). Built on former citrus groves, Arcadia is known for well-irrigated, mature landscaping. Several yards prominently feature orange, lemon and grapefruit trees as reminders of the area's past; the area used to be occupied by citrus farmers from 1919 to the mid-1950s. In the mid-1950s, the rest of Phoenix caught up with the farms and the area suburbanized with characteristic ranch homes on large lots. Arcadia High School serves and derives its name from the neighborhood. Arcadia is frequently listed as the top place to live in all of Phoenix Metro due to its ideal location for both work and fun, vibrant food / culture, walk-ability, and plush landscape. It is also just south of the desired hiking destinations of Camelback Mountain and Piestewa Peak. Much of Phoenix's cycling scene pedals through this neighborhood, as Campbell / Lafayette is one of the main Phoenix cycling corridors.

The film Everything Must Go takes place in Arcadia.

Arcadia is also home to the Verizon 5G Performance Center, the newest practice facility of the Phoenix Suns located on 44th Street and Camelback Road. The plans to vote for it were first discussed in December 2018, eventually agreeing on the final details in early 2019 with the team both building their new practice facility in Arcadia and helping out in renovating the currently named Footprint Center in exchange for extending their arena lease until 2037 (with an option to later extend it until 2042). The Performance Center was eventually completed in November 2020 during the COVID-19 pandemic, one month before the Suns began their 2020–21 season.

References

Neighborhoods in Phoenix, Arizona